Kyle Lyndon Adonis Sanchez Edwards (born March 15, 1997) is a Vincentian footballer who plays for Hartford Athletic.

Career

Caribbean 
Edwards played for System 3 in the NLA Premier League and Grenades in the Antigua and Barbuda Premier Division.

United States college and amateur 
In the United States, Edwards played two years of college soccer at Ranger College, before transferring to the University of Texas Rio Grande Valley in 2017, where he played for two seasons.

While at college, Edwards appeared for National Premier Soccer League side Houston Dutch Lions in 2018, and with USL League Two side Brazos Valley Cavalry in 2019, where he jointly won the league Golden Boot award. He also spent time with System 3 and Grenades during the summers.

Professional 
On January 7, 2020, Edwards signed for USL Championship side Rio Grande Valley FC. On January 13, 2020, Houston Dynamo drafted Edwards 86th overall in the 2020 MLS SuperDraft. 

On December 7, 2022, it was announced Edwards would join USL Championship side Hartford Athletic for their 2023 season.

International
Since 2014, Edwards has played with the Saint Vincent and the Grenadines national team.

References

External links 
 Kyle Edwards – 2019 – Men's Soccer UTRGV bio
  RGVFC bio

1997 births
Living people
Saint Vincent and the Grenadines footballers
Saint Vincent and the Grenadines international footballers
Saint Vincent and the Grenadines expatriate footballers
Expatriate soccer players in the United States
Saint Vincent and the Grenadines expatriate sportspeople in the United States
Association football forwards
UT Rio Grande Valley Vaqueros men's soccer players
Brazos Valley Cavalry FC players
Houston Dutch Lions players
Rio Grande Valley FC Toros players
National Premier Soccer League players
USL League Two players
Houston Dynamo FC draft picks
MLS Next Pro players
Hartford Athletic players